Halder may refer to:

People
 Franz Halder, a German general in World War II

Places
India
 Halder Para, Gangarampur, a neighborhood
 Netherlands
 Halder (Netherlands), a hamlet
United States
 Halder, Wisconsin, an unincorporated community